Tejgaon Government Girls' High School is located in Dhaka, Bangladesh. It was founded in 1955, making it one of the oldest public schools in Dhaka. The school runs from first grade to tenth grade, and prides itself on helping families to educate their children at little or no cost. It is administrated by the Dhaka Education Board.

Academic performance
Tejgaon Government Girls' High School's results from 2007 to 2010 for the Secondary School Certificate level examinations are as follows:

Gallery

References

Educational institutions established in 1955
Girls' schools in Bangladesh
High schools in Bangladesh
Schools in Dhaka District
1955 establishments in East Pakistan